Kenneth S. Carslaw is Professor of Atmospheric Science at the University of Leeds.

He was educated at the University of Birmingham (BSc, 1989) and the University of East Anglia (MSc, 1991; PhD, 1994). He was awarded a Philip Leverhulme Prize in 2001, a Royal Society Wolfson Research Merit Award in 2011 and the American Geophysical Union Ascent Award in 2014. He is a Thomson Reuters Highly Cited Scientist.

He is Executive editor of Atmospheric Chemistry and Physics.

Awards and honors 
Carslaw was elected as a Fellow of the American Geophysical Union in 2019.

References

Year of birth missing (living people)
Living people
Alumni of the University of Birmingham
Alumni of the University of East Anglia
Academics of the University of Leeds
Royal Society Wolfson Research Merit Award holders
Fellows of the American Geophysical Union